The 16331/16332 Mumbai Chhatrapati Shivaji Maharaj Terminus–Thiruvananthapuram Central Weekly Express is an Express train belonging to Southern Railway zone that runs between Chhatrapati Shivaji Maharaj Terminus railway station and  in India. It is not currently running.

Service

The 16331/Mumbai Chhatrapati Shivaji Maharaj Terminus–Thiruvananthapuram Central Weekly Express has an average speed of 50 km/hr and covers 1946 km in 39h 10m. The 16332/Thiruvananthapuram Central–Mumbai Chhatrapati Shivaji Maharaj Terminus Weekly Express has an average speed of 48 km/hr and covers 1946 km in 40h 25m.

Route and halts 

The important halts of the train are:

 
  Central

Coach composition

The train has standard ICF rakes with a max speed of 110 kmph. The train consists of 21 coaches:

 2 AC II Tier
 3 AC III Tier
 11 Sleeper coaches
 1 Pantry car
 2 General Unreserved
 2 Seating cum Luggage Rake

Traction
An erode/KYN based WAP-7 hauls the train end to end in both directions.

Schedule  

16331 – Starts from Chhatrapati Shivaji Maharaj Terminus every Monday at afternoon 12:10 PM IST and reaches Thiruvananthapuram Central on Wednesday at morning 3:50 AM IST
16332 – Starts from Thiruvananthapuram Central every Saturday at morning 4:24 AM IST and reaches Chhatrapati Shivaji Maharaj Terminus on Sunday 8:50 PM IST

Rake sharing

06059/06060 – Puratchi Thalaivar Dr. M.G. Ramachandran Central railway station– Summer Special

See also 

 Chhatrapati Shivaji Maharaj Terminus railway station
 Thiruvananthapuram Central

Notes

References

External links 

 16331/Mumbai CST–Thiruvananthapuram Weekly Express India Rail Info
 16332/Thiruvananthapuram–Mumbai CST Weekly Express India Rail Info

Transport in Mumbai
Transport in Thiruvananthapuram
Express trains in India
Rail transport in Maharashtra
Rail transport in Karnataka
Rail transport in Andhra Pradesh
Rail transport in Tamil Nadu
Rail transport in Kerala